Black Knob is a descriptive name for a big black rock outcrop  west of Twin Crater on Hut Point Peninsula, Ross Island. It is located north of McMurdo Station. The name has been used in reports and maps since at least 1971.

References 

Hills of Ross Island
Volcanoes of Ross Island